The women's taijijian competition at the 2019 World Wushu Championships in Shanghai, China was held on 20 October at the Minhang Gymnasium.

Results

References

External links
Official website

Tai chi
World Wushu Championships
2019 in martial arts